The Voice of the Silence is a book by Helena Petrovna Blavatsky. It was written in Fontainebleau and first published in 1889. According to Blavatsky, it is a translation of fragments from a sacred book she encountered during her studies in the East, called "The Book of the Golden Precepts".

Contents 
The book is formed of three parts:

 The Voice of the Silence
 The Two Paths
 The Seven Portals

Reception 
A reviewer for D. T. Suzuki's Eastern Buddhist Society commented: "Undoubtedly Madame Blavatsky had in some way been initiated into the deeper side of Mahayana teaching and then gave out what she deemed wise to the Western world..." In the journal of the Buddhist Society, Suzuki commented: "here is the real Mahayana Buddhism".

The 14th Dalai Lama wrote the preface for the centennial edition by Concord Grove Press.

See also 
 Blavatsky's poetry
 Book of Dzyan

References

External links 
The Voice of the Silence online

1889 non-fiction books
Books by Helena Blavatsky
Theosophical texts